Cristián Romero  may refer to:

 Cristián Romero (footballer, born 1963), most recently managed Club Universidad de Chile
 Cristian Romero (footballer, born 1998), currently playing for Club Atlético Belgrano